Thanuka Dabare (born 20 August 1998) is a Sri Lankan cricketer. He made his first-class debut for Saracens Sports Club in the 2017–18 Premier League Tournament on 12 January 2018. He made his List A debut for Saracens Sports Club in the 2017–18 Premier Limited Overs Tournament on 9 March 2018.

TCL A-Reserve
Thanuka Dabare played one game of A-Reserve in TCL. His wicket fell in the seventh over: Bowled by Corey Terry and caught by Beau Polley.

References

External links
 

1998 births
Living people
Sri Lankan cricketers
Saracens Sports Club cricketers
Place of birth missing (living people)